The 1977 Toyota Classic, was a women's tennis tournament played on outdoor grass courts at Kooyong in Melbourne in Australia. The event was part of the AA category of the 1978 Colgate Series. It was the 15th edition of the tournament and was held from 21 November through 27 November 1977. Eighth-seeded Evonne Goolagong Cawley won the singles title and earned $14,000 first-prize money and 160 ranking points.

Winners

Singles
 Evonne Goolagong Cawley defeated  Wendy Turnbull 6–4, 6–1
It was Goolagong Cawley's 2nd title of the year and the 68th of her career.

Doubles
 Evonne Goolagong Cawley /  Betty Stöve defeated  Patricia Bostrom /  Kym Ruddell 6–3, 6–0

Prize money

Notes

References

External links
 International Tennis Federation (ITF) tournament details

Toyota Classic
Toyota Classic
Toyota Classic
Tennis tournaments in Australia